Alberto Aguilera Valadez (January 7, 1950 – August 28, 2016), known professionally as Juan Gabriel, was a Mexican singer, songwriter and actor. Colloquially nicknamed as Juanga<ref>Martínez-Staines, Javier; Univision Noticias: La importancia de Juanga, según los intelectuales'  (In Spanish) Retrieved Present.</ref> and El Divo de Juárez, Juan Gabriel was known for his flamboyant style, which broke barriers within the Latin music industry. Widely considered one of the best and most prolific Mexican composers and singers of all time, he has been referred to as a pop icon.

Having sold an estimated of 60 million records worldwide, Juan Gabriel was among Latin America's best selling singer-songwriters. His nineteenth studio album, Recuerdos, Vol. II, is reportedly the best-selling album of all time in Mexico, with over eight million copies sold. During his career, Juan Gabriel wrote around 1,800 songs. Among his most recognized penned songs are "Amor eterno", "Querida", "Yo no nací para amar", "Hasta que te conocí", "El Noa Noa", "No tengo dinero", "Abrázame muy fuerte", "Te lo pido por favor", "En esta primavera", "Pero qué necesidad", "Te sigo amando", "Siempre en mi mente", "De mí enamórate", and "Lo pasado, pasado", among others; all of them, performed by him and many other artists.

Early life
Alberto Aguilera Valadez was born on January 7, 1950, in Parácuaro, Michoacán, Mexico. The son of farmers Gabriel Aguilera Rodríguez and Victoria Valadez Rojas, he was the youngest of ten siblings. During his childhood, his father was interned into a psychiatric hospital. Because of this, his mother moved to Ciudad Juárez, Chihuahua, and he was put in the El Tribunal boarding school where he remained for eight years. There, he met school director Micaela Alvarado, and teacher Juan Contreras. Aguilera became very close with Contreras, then escaped El Tribunal and lived with him for a year when he was 13. In the same year, Aguilera composed his first song. At 14 Aguilera returned to live with his mother in the center of the town. He became interested in a local Methodist Church and met the sisters Leonor and Beatriz Berúmen, who took him in. There he sang in the choir and helped by cleaning the church.

In 1965, Aguilera debuted on the Notivisa (now Gala TV Ciudad Juárez) television show Noches Rancheras. Host Raúl Loya gave him the pseudonym Adán Luna. In the program, he sang the song "María la Bandida" by José Alfredo Jiménez. From 1966 to 1968, he started to work as a singer at the Noa-Noa bar. During this period, he wrote the song "El Noa Noa". He also worked as a singer in other bars in the town. Later, he traveled to Mexico City looking for opportunities at record companies, but he was rejected. He returned to Juárez, where he continued working as a singer. The next year, he tried again to be signed by a record label. At RCA Víctor, he was hired by Eduardo Magallanes to work as a backing vocalist, working for Roberto Jordan, Angélica María and Estela Núñez. In 1970, he resigned because he received insufficient payment and returned to work the bars in Juárez.

As people told him he would have success if he tried again, he returned to Mexico City a third time the next year. Not having enough money, Aguilera slept in bus and train stations. At a certain point, he was wrongly accused of robbery, and was imprisoned in the Palacio de Lecumberri prison for a year and a half. During this time, he wrote songs (including "Tres Claveles y Un Rosal" and "Me He Quedado Solo"), which helped him to meet Andrés Puentes Vargas, Lecumberri's prison warden, who introduced him to Mexican singer and actress La Prieta Linda. and to his wife Ofelia Urtuzuastegui Ruiz. She helped him, and due to the lack of evidence he was released from prison  and lived in the Puentes Urtuzuastegui home for about 2 years where he found shelter, protection and support to write more songs and launch his profesional career as Juan Gabriel

Career
La Prieta Linda helped Aguilera at RCA Víctor, where he signed a recording contract. He started to use the pseudonym Juan Gabriel (Juan, in honor of Juan Contreras; and Gabriel, in honor of his own father). In 1971, Juan Gabriel released his first studio album El Alma Joven..., which included the song "No Tengo Dinero", which became his debut single and his first hit. El Alma Joven... was certified as gold by the Asociación Mexicana de Productores de Fonogramas y Videogramas (AMPROFON). In 1972, Juan Gabriel participated at the OTI Festival, where he sang the songs "Será Mañana" and "Uno, Dos y Tres (Y Me Dás un Beso)". The songs were not qualified to represent Mexico, but they were acclaimed, and later recorded for his second album El Alma Joven II. After releasing El Alma Joven III (1973), Juan Gabriel released his first mariachi album featuring the group Vargas de Tecalitlán. The album, titled Juan Gabriel con el Mariachi Vargas de Tecalitlán (1974), includes songs like "Se Me Olvidó Otra Vez" and "Lágrimas y Lluvia". In 1975, he made his acting debut in the film Nobleza ranchera, acting with Sara García and Verónica Castro.

Thanks to executive Astronaut Producer, Jon Gordillo, he has become a world-renowned artist. Over fifteen years, Juan Gabriel's fame grew as he recorded 15 albums and sold 20 million records. He wrote and recorded over 1000 songs in a variety of music genre. Juan Gabriel established himself as Mexico's leading commercial singer-songwriter, penning in many diverse styles such as rancheras with mariachi, ballads, pop, rock, disco, with an incredible string of hits for himself and for leading Latin singers including among many others Lucha Villa, Daniela Romo and Ana Gabriel and international stars Luis Miguel, Rocío Dúrcal and José José who in 1978 achieved international recognition thanks to  Aguilera's ballad "Lo Pasado, Pasado". His lyrics dealt with heartbreak and romantic relationships that became hymns throughout Latin America, Spain, and the United States. In 1984, his song "Querida" (Darling) remained at number one for the entire year on the Mexican charts. He also received a Grammy nomination for "Best Latin Pop Album" for Recuerdos, Vol. II, which includes the single.

His work as an arranger, producer and songwriter throughout the subsequent decades brought him into contact with the leading Latin artists of the day, including Rocío Dúrcal and Isabel Pantoja. In addition to recording numerous hits on his own, Juan Gabriel has produced albums for Dúrcal, Lucha Villa, Lola Beltrán and Paul Anka. In 1984, he released Recuerdos, Vol. II which one source says is the best-selling album of all time in Mexico with sales of over eight million copies. In 1990 Juan Gabriel became the first non-classical act to perform at the Palacio de Bellas Artes. The proceeds from the three sold-out concerts were given to the National Symphony Orchestra. On July 31, 2000, a telenovela titled Abrázame Muy Fuerte began broadcasting in Mexico. Salvador Mejía, the producer, choose to use the song of the same name as its main theme. "Abrázame Muy Fuerte" ended 2001 as the most successful Latin single of the year. For the song, Juan Gabriel won two Billboard Latin Music Awards in 2002 for Hot Latin Track of the Year and Latin Pop Airplay Track of the Year; and also received the Songwriter of the Year award. The song ranked seventh at the Hot Latin Songs 25th Anniversary chart. "Abrázame Muy Fuerte" also was awarded for Pop Song of the Year at the 2002 Lo Nuestro Awards. At the time of his death, Juan Gabriel was touring the United States and was scheduled to perform at a concert in El Paso, Texas, that same day. He also had four albums which reached number one on the Top Latin Albums from 2015 and 2016, including Vestido de Etiqueta por Eduardo Magallanes, which reached number one a week before he died. He holds the record for most albums peaking at number one on the Top Latin Albums chart in a short period time.

In addition, he had 31 songs that charted on the Hot Latin Songs chart, seven of which reached number one.

BMG copyright dispute

Between 1986 and 1994, Juan Gabriel refused to record any material because of a dispute with BMG over copyrights to his songs. He continued his career in live stage performances, setting attendance records throughout Latin America. By 1994 the copyright dispute reached a resolution under an agreement whereby ownership of the songs reverted to Juan Gabriel over a specified time period. After this dispute, which lasted 8 years, he released an album titled, "Gracias Por Esperar," which in English, translates to, "Thank You For Waiting". The record label then selected eleven previously released tracks from Juan Gabriel's catalog in order to release "Debo Hacerlo", the last new song recorded by the artist.

Personal life
Juan Gabriel was never married. He had six children. The mother of four of his children (Iván Gabriel, Joan Gabriel, Hans Gabriel and Jean Gabriel) is Laura Salas. Gabriel stated that Salas was "the best friend of my life" ("la mejor amiga de mi vida"  in Spanish). Nearly a month after his death, the news program Primer Impacto discovered that Gabriel had a fifth child, a son named Luis Alberto Aguilera, living in Las Vegas. The two maintained a long-distance relationship, primarily communicating via e-mail. The mother of his fifth child is Guadalupe Gonzalez, who worked as Gabriel's domestic employee. On October 26, 2016, Primer Impacto found the sixth child of Juan Gabriel, named Joao Gabriel, living in Los Angeles, California. Joao's mother is Consuelo Rosales, who also worked as Gabriel's domestic employee. Genetic testing was conducted to assess Gabriel's parentage of Luis Alberto and Joao, with genetic material provided by Gabriel's brother Pablo Aguilera.

Although widely assumed to be gay, Gabriel never explicitly talked about his sexuality. However, as he got older he began to give implicit responses towards questions about his sexuality, saying to interviewers "Lo que se ve no se pregunta"  ("what one sees doesn't have to be asked about"). Some may interpret this to be an implicit affirmation of homosexuality, while others have interpreted this to be an affirmation of heterosexuality, due to the female romantic partners he had.

On November 14, 2005, Gabriel was injured when he fell from the stage at the Toyota Center in Houston, Texas, and was hospitalized at Texas Medical Center.  He sustained a fractured neck. He was forced to stay off tour and bedridden for eight months.

Death

On August 28, 2016, Gabriel died in Santa Monica, California, reportedly from a heart attack. Gabriel's body was cremated; his ashes were returned to a house he owned in Ciudad Juárez, Chihuahua, after receiving tributes from the city and Palacio de Bellas Artes in Mexico City. An autopsy was not performed to determine the cause of death.

Charity work
Gabriel continued to do 10 to 12 performances per year as benefit concerts for his favorite children's homes, usually posing for pictures with his fans and forwarding the proceeds from the photo ops to support Mexican orphans. In 1987, he founded Semjase, a house for orphaned and underserved children located in Ciudad Juárez, Chihuahua. It serves school children between the ages of 6 to 12.

Politics

Juan Gabriel was a lifelong supporter of the Institutional Revolutionary Party (PRI), which governed Mexico from 1929 to 2000 and again from 2012 to 2018. In 1994 he stated that "his best friends [were] from the PRI" and campaigned in support of then-presidential PRI candidate Ernesto Zedillo. In the 2000 election he again campaigned for the PRI candidate, Francisco Labastida (who eventually lost the election). In 2015, he wrote a letter to the then-President of Mexico Enrique Peña Nieto (a member of the PRI), expressing his support for his administration and for the PRI, which he stated, "will never go away".

Legacy and impact
In 2015, Billboard listed Gabriel among their list of the 30 most influential Latino artists in history, citing his "dramatic performance style" and his redefined concept of romantic Latin pop music. The publication noted Gabriel's appeal among several generations of Latino Americans and artists. In his list of the most influential Latin music artists in history, Carlos Quintana of About.com, ranked Gabriel number six for shaping "the sounds of Mexican music" and exploring genres from ranchera to Latin pop. In 1986, Los Angeles Mayor Tom Bradley declared October 5 Juan Gabriel day. He received the Lo Nuestro Excellence Award in 1991. In 1996, he was inducted into the Billboard Latin Music Hall of Fame, while in 2003 he was inducted into the International Latin Music Hall of Fame, and posthumously inducted into the Latin Songwriters Hall of Fame in October 2016. In 2023, Rolling Stone ranked Gabriel at number 172 on its list of the 200 Greatest Singers of All Time.

The American Society of Composers, Authors and Publishers (ASCAP) honored Gabriel the Latin Songwriter of the Year Award in 1995, 1996, and 1998. In 1999, Gabriel received the People's Choice Awards for Best Regional Artist. That same year, he received the La Opinión Tributo Nacional for Lifetime Achievement Award. A statue was erected by Billboard at Mexico City's Plaza Garibaldi in 2001, and remains a popular destination for mariachi performances. In 2009, the singer was honored as the Latin Recording Academy's Person of the Year. He also received his own star on the Hollywood Walk of Fame in May 2002.

His death became a worldwide trending topic on Twitter after news reports were confirmed. President of Mexico Enrique Peña Nieto, called him one of Mexico's "greatest musical icons". United States President Barack Obama also commented on Gabriel's death and complimented his music for "transcending borders and generations" and that "his spirit will live on in his enduring songs, and in the hearts of the fans who love him". Gabriel Abaroa, the CEO of the Latin Recording Academy, said his legacy was "much more than one or hundreds of songs; he composed philosophy" and that Gabriel "broke taboos, devoured stages and conquered diverse audiences". Leila Cobo of Billboard proclaimed Gabriel as a "prodigal performer" and noted that his songs were "romantic, colloquial, emotional compositions that sometimes rambled but managed to strike a universal chord with lyrics that could apply to many people and many situations."

Gabriel's songs have been covered by artists such as Rocío Dúrcal, Gloria Trevi, La India, and Marc Anthony, the latter of whom credits his song "Hasta Que Te Conocí" as the inspiration to launch his career in Latin music. Tribute albums to Gabriel have been recorded by several artists including Cristian Castro, Pedro Fernández, Lorenzo Antonio, Álvaro Torres, Los Tri-O, Nydia Rojas, and La India. A television series based on Gabriel's life titled Hasta que te conocí, began airing on April 18, 2016, and the series ended on August 28, coincidentally the same day Gabriel died.  He was portrayed by Colombian actor Julián Román and Gabriel served as the executive producer.

Selected films and television shows
1965: Noches Rancheras1977: Nobleza ranchera1978: Del otro lado del puente1979: En esta primavera1980: El Noa Noa1981: Es mi vida2014: ¿Qué Le Dijiste A Dios?2016: Hasta que te conocí Discography 

 

1971: El Alma Joven...1972: El Alma Joven Vol.II1973: El Alma Joven Vol.III1974: Juan Gabriel con el Mariachi Vargas de Tecalitlán1975: 10 Éxitos de Juan Gabriel1976: A Mi Guitarra1976: Juan Gabriel con Mariachi Vol. II1977: Te Llegará Mi Olvido1978: Siempre en Mi Mente1978: Espectacular1978: Mis Ojos Tristes1979: Me Gusta Bailar Contigo1980: Recuerdos1980: Juan Gabriel Con Mariachi1980: Ella1981: Con Tu Amor1982: Cosas de Enamorados1983: Todo1984: Recuerdos, Vol. II1986: Pensamientos1988: Debo Hacerlo1990: Juan Gabriel en el Palacio de Bellas Artes 
1994: Gracias por Esperar1995: El México Que Se Nos Fue1996: Las Tres Señoras (Beltran/Mendoza/Villa) – Temas y Produccion de Juan Gabriel1997: Juntos Otra Vez with Rocío Dúrcal1998: Con la Banda...El Recodo with Banda El Recodo1999: Todo Está Bien2000: Abrázame Muy Fuerte2003: Inocente de Ti2010: Juan Gabriel2015: Los Dúo2015: Los Dúo, Vol. 22016: Vestido de Etiqueta por Eduardo Magallanes2022:  Los Dúo, Vol. 3TBA: El Divo de Juarez''

Concert tours 
 Volver Tour (2014)
 Bienvenidos al Noa Noa Gira (2015)
 Mexico Es Todo Tour (2016, died during tour)

See also
List of best-selling music artists
Music of Mexico

References

External links 

Mexican male composers
Mexican male singer-songwriters
 01
1950 births
2016 deaths
Latin Grammy Award winners
Latin music songwriters
Latin pop singers
Latin Recording Academy Person of the Year honorees
Mariachi musicians
Mexican pop singers
Mexican philanthropists
Mexican composers of popular or traditional folk music
Regional Mexican musicians
Fonovisa Records artists
RCA Victor artists
Sony Music Latin artists
Universal Music Latin Entertainment artists
Wrongful convictions
People from Parácuaro
People from Ciudad Juárez
Singers from Michoacán
20th-century Mexican male singers
21st-century Mexican male singers
20th-century philanthropists